Daniel Albert "Bud" Hafey (August 6, 1912 – July 27, 1986) was an outfielder in Major League Baseball. He played for the Chicago White Sox, Pittsburgh Pirates, Cincinnati Reds, and Philadelphia Phillies.

References

External links

1912 births
1986 deaths
Major League Baseball outfielders
Chicago White Sox players
Pittsburgh Pirates players
Cincinnati Reds players
Philadelphia Phillies players
Baseball players from Berkeley, California